Big Bay de Noc is a bay in the Upper Peninsula of the U.S. state of Michigan. The bay, which opens into Lake Michigan's Green Bay, is enclosed by Delta County. The Garden Peninsula is on the east side of the bay and the Stonington Peninsula is on the west side. The small Delta County settlements of Garden and Nahma are harbors on the shore of the bay.

As with the more thickly-settled Little Bay de Noc, the bay's name comes from the Noquet (or Noc) Native American people (thought to have been related to the Menominee of the Algonquian language group), who once lived along the shores.

The bay is historically important for its 19th-century use as a center of the Lake Michigan iron smelting industry.  A former smelting complex has been preserved as Fayette State Park.  The state park's Snail Shell Harbor, off Big Bay de Noc, offers a harbor of refuge for small boats and yachts.

A lighthouse, the Peninsula Point Light, marks the entrance of the bay.

Climate

References

External links
Bays de Noc Convention and Visitors Bureau

Bodies of water of Delta County, Michigan
Bays of Michigan
Bays of Lake Michigan